Events from the year 1704 in France.

Incumbents 
Monarch: Louis XIV

Events
 13 August – War of the Spanish Succession – Battle of Blenheim: Allied troops under John Churchill, the Earl of Marlborough and Prince Eugene of Savoy defeat the Franco-Bavarian army.

Births
 12 February – Charles Pinot Duclos, writer (died 1772)
 28 February – Louis Godin, astronomer (died 1760)
 3 August – Catherine-Nicole Lemaure, operatic soprano (died 1786)
 24 June – Jean-Baptiste de Boyer, Marquis d'Argens, writer (died 1771)

Deaths
 2 February – Guillaume François Antoine, Marquis de l'Hôpital, mathematician (born 1661)
 24 February – Marc-Antoine Charpentier, composer (born 1643)
 12 April – Jacques-Bénigne Bossuet, bishop and writer (born 1627)
 13 May – Louis Bourdaloue, Jesuit preacher (born 1632)
 7 July – Pierre-Charles Le Sueur, fur trader and explorer (born c. 1657)
 14 August – Roland Laporte, Protestant leader (born 1675)

See also

References

1700s in France